= Rosebery Primary School =

Location
- George Street; Loughborough, Leicestershire, LE11 5DQ; England; 52°46′27″N 1°13′16″W

Information
- Type: Primary
- Established: 1897
- Closed: 2006
- Local authority: Leicestershire
- Department for Education URN: 120062 Tables
- Ofsted: Reports
- Gender: Coeducational
- Age: 4 to 11

Rosebery Primary School was a primary school in Loughborough, Leicestershire, England. It was opened in 1897 and closed by Leicestershire Local Authority in 2006, despite a protracted battle between the local community and the local government.

In March 2007, the school was Grade II listed as having notable historical importance. The listing protects it from demolition and insensitive development. The building and grounds were sold by auction on 20 June 2007 for £875,000, and planning proposals were submitted in October 2007
